Medan is the capital of North Sumatra province and one of the largest cities in Indonesia. It is the largest city in the island of Sumatra, also the largest city in Indonesian archipelago outside the island of Java. Medan was transformed rapidly from a small kampong of few hundred people in 1869 into the largest city in Sumatra and when the Sultan of Deli moved their residence in 1891, Medan became the capital of North Sumatra. Rapid development ushered a western-centric development in Medan. Medan has many colonial architectural sites, while accompanying its growth as a metropolitan city. Construction of high-rise buildings in the city was restricted to 12 floors according to the Regulation of Flight Safety Operations because of the presence of Soewondo Airbase in the center of Medan. However, since commencing operation of Kuala Namu International Airport in 2013, construction of high-rise buildings in the city is booming. There are currently nine 150m+ buildings and another five are under construction.

List of tallest buildings
This list includes completed and topped off buildings that have 29 floors or more.

List of tallest buildings under construction and proposed

Under construction
This is a list of high-rise buildings that are under construction in Medan and have at least 20 floors.

Proposed
This is the list of high-rise buildings that are proposed to be built in Medan and are planned to have at least 20 floors.

See also

List of colonial buildings in Medan
 List of tallest buildings in Batam
List of tallest buildings in Jakarta
List of tallest buildings in Surabaya
List of tallest buildings in Indonesia

References

Tallest, Medan
Buildings and structures in Medan
Medan